In proportional representation (PR) electoral systems, an underhang seat is a seat that becomes vacant because the party that was entitled to it by virtue of its share of the total votes cast was unable to fill it through having submitted too few candidates.

Under party-list proportional representation systems, parties receive a number of seats in proportion to the number of votes they received. If a party does not have enough people to fill its vacancies, there is an underhang. For example, if a party wins enough votes for ten seats, but only has seven people nominated on its list, then there is an underhang of three seats.

Parties with underhangs usually are not entitled to retroactively add to their list, and lose the potential seats represented by the underhang. For instance, if New Zealand's 99 MP Party (whose stated manifesto was to reduce the size of parliament) had received five percent of the vote in the 2005 New Zealand general election, they would have been entitled to six seats within the 120 seat House of Representatives. But because they had just two people on their list, they would have filled only two seats. The House would thus have shrunk by four MPs. Since the party received only 0.03% of the vote, this eventuality was avoided.

Another way of dealing with underhangs is to allow the party to nominate people to become MPs.

In the Scottish Parliament an underhang seat was caused by the death of Margo MacDonald in 2014. As she was elected as a regional list MSP as an independent (effectively the sole candidate of "the Margo party") her seat was left vacant until the next election.

Parties aim to avoid the problem by having a substantially larger list than they would hope to win as seats.

See also 

Overhang seat

Party-list proportional representation